S/2004 S 36 is a natural satellite of Saturn. Its discovery was announced by Scott S. Sheppard, David C. Jewitt, and Jan Kleyna on October 8, 2019 from observations taken between December 12, 2004 and February 1, 2006.

S/2004 S 36 is about 3 kilometres in diameter, and orbits Saturn at an average distance of 23.192 Gm in 1319.07 days, at an inclination of 155° to the ecliptic, in a retrograde direction and with an eccentricity of 0.748, the highest of any of Saturn's moons.

References

Norse group
Irregular satellites
Moons of Saturn
Discoveries by Scott S. Sheppard
Astronomical objects discovered in 2019
Moons with a retrograde orbit